The following is a bibliography of classical guitar related publications.

The classical guitar (also called the "Spanish guitar" or "nylon string guitar") is a six-stringed plucked string instrument from the family of instruments called chordophones. The classical guitar is well known for its comprehensive right-hand technique, which allows the soloist to perform complex melodic and polyphonic material, in much the same manner as the piano.

A
Annala, Hannu & Mätlik, Heiki:  Handbook of Guitar and Lute Composers (Pacific, Missouri: Mel Bay, 2007)
Ansorge, Peter & Richter, Helmut (eds.): Die klassische Gitarre im 20. Jahrhundert. Beiträge zu ihrer Entwicklung im deutschsprachigen Raum (Oberhausen: European Guitar Teachers Association Deutschland e.V., 2010)
Appleby, Wilfrid M.: The Evolution of the Classic Guitar: a Tentative Outline (Cheltenham, Glos.: International Classic Guitar Association, 1966)
Azpiazu Iriarte, José de: The Guitar and Guitarists, from the Beginning to the Present Day (London: G. Ricordi, 1960)

B
Bacon, Tony: The History of the American Guitar. From 1833 to the Present Day (New York: Friedman/Fairfax Publishers, 2001)
Bellow, Alexander: The Illustrated History of the Guitar (New York: Franco Colombo, 1970; 2nd edition, Long Island, NY: Belwin/Mills Publishing Corp., 1976)
Bobri, Vladimir: The Segovia Technique (London: Macmillan, 1972; paperback edition, New York: Collier Books, 1977; 2nd edition, Westport, Conn.: The Bold Strummer Ltd., 1990)
Bone, Philip J.: The Guitar and Mandolin. Biographies of Celebrated Players and Composers (London: Schott & Co., 1914; revised edition, [same publisher] 1954; reprint with new foreword by Irene Bone, [same publisher] 1970)
Brondi, Maria Rita: Il liuto e la chitarra. Ricerche storiche sulla loro origine e sul loro sviluppo (Torino: Fratelli Bocca, 1926)
Buek, Fritz: Die Gitarre und ihre Meister (Berlin: Robert Lienau, 1926)

C
Carfagna, Carlo: Chitarra. Storia e immagini (Rome: Fratelli Palombi, c.2000)
Charnassé, Hélène: Les instruments à cordes pincées: harpe, luth et guitare (Paris: Presses Universitaires de France, 1970)
Coelho, Victor Anand (ed.): The Cambridge Companion to the Guitar (Cambridge: Cambridge University Press, 2003)
Cooper, Colin: Guitar Interviews. Vol. 1: Best from Classical Guitar Magazine (Pacific, Missouri: Mel Bay, 2001)

F
Fokken Alcazar, Miguel (ed.) & Segal, Peter (transl.): The Segovia-Ponce Letters (Columbus, Ohio: Editions Orphée, 1990)
Freeth, Nick & Alexander, Charles: The Guitar (Philadelphia: Running Press, c.2002)

G
Grunfeld, Frederic V.: The Art and Times of the Guitar. An Illustrated History of Guitars and Guitarists (London: Macmillan, c.1969)

H
Hacker-Klier, Ingrid & Klier, Johannes: Die Gitarre. Ein Instrument und seine Geschichte (Bad Schussenried: Bruckbauer [Biblioteca de la Guitarra], 1980)
Hackl, Stefan: Die Gitarre in Österreich. Von Abate Costa bis Zykan (Innsbruck: Studienverlag, 2011)
Herrera, Francisco (ed.): Enciclopedia de la guitarra. Biografías, Danzas, Historía, Organología, Técnica, 6 volumes or CD-ROM (Valencia: Piles, 2001; 3rd edition, 2006)
Hindrichs, Thorsten: Zwischen 'leerer Klimperey' und 'wirklicher Kunst'. Gitarrenmusik in Deutschland um 1800 (Münster: Waxmann, 2012)
Hoek, Jan-Anton van: Die Gitarrenmusik im 19. Jahrhundert: Geschichte, Technik, Interpretation (Wilhelmshaven: Heinrichshofen, 1983)
Huber, Karl: Die Wiederbelebung des künstlerischen Gitarrespiels um 1900. Untersuchungen zur Sozialgeschichte des Laienmusikwesens und zur Tradition der klassischen Gitarre (Augsburg: Lisardo, 1995)

I
Sharon Isbin: Classical Guitar Answer Book (Milwaukee, Wisconsin: Hal Leonard, 1999)

J
Janssens, Robert: Geschiedenis van de luit en de gitaar (Antwerpen: Metropolis, c.1980)
Jape, Mijndert: Classical Guitar Music in Print (Philadelphia: Musicdata Inc., 1989)

K
Kuronen, Darcy / Kaye Lenny / Tremblay, Carl: Dangerous Curves. The Art of the Guitar (Boston: MFA Publications, c.2000)

M
Maslen, J.: Guitars and Guitar Playing. A List of Selected References and Music (Melbourne: State Library of Victoria, 1966)
McCutcheon, Meredith: Guitar and Vihuela. An Annotated Bibliography (New York: Pendragon Press, c.1985)
Monno, Johannes: Die Barockgitarre. Darstellung ihrer Entwicklung und Spielweise (Munich: Tree Edition, c.1995)

N
Nickel, Heinz: Beitrag zur Entwicklung der Giterre in Europa (Haimhausen: Biblioteca de la Guitarra, 1972)
Noonan, Jeffrey J.: The Guitar in America: Victorian Era to Jazz (Jackson, Mississippi: University Press of Mississippi, 2008)
Noonan, Jeffrey J.: The Guitar in American Banjo, Mandolin and Guitar Periodicals, 1882-1933 (Madison: A-R Editions, 2009)

P
Päffgen, Peter: Die Gitarre. Grundzüge ihrer Entwicklung (Mainz: Schott, 1988; revised edition, 2002)
Powroźniak, Józef: Gitara od A do Z (Kraków: Polskie Wydawnictwo Muzyczne, c.1978; German edition as Gitarren-Lexikon (Berlin: Verlag Neue Musik, 1979; 3rd edition, 1986)
Prat, Domingo: Diccionario de Guitarristas (Buenos Aires: Romero & Fernandez, 1934; reprint: Columbus, Ohio: Éditions Orphée, 1986)
Emilio Pujol: El dilemma del sonido en la guitarra (Buenos Aires: Ricordi Americana, [date?])

R
Ragossnig, Konrad: Handbuch der Gitarre und Laute (Mainz: Schott, 1987; revised edition, 2004)
Radole, Giuseppe: Liuto, chitarra e vihuela (Milano: Suvini Zerboni, 1979)
Regazzi, Roberto: The Complete Luthiers Library (Bologna: Florenus Edizioni, 1990)
Restle, Conny & Li, Christopher (eds.): Faszination Gitarre (Berlin: Nicolaische Verlagsbuchhandlung, 2010)
Rodriquez, Manuel: Art and Craft of Making Classical Guitars (Milwaukee, Wisconsin: Hal Leonard, 2004)

S
Schmitz, Peter:  Gitarrenmusik für Dilettanten. Entwicklung und Stellenwert des Gitarrenspiels in der bürgerlichen Musikpraxis der ersten Hälfte des 19. Jahrhunderts im deutschsprachigen Raum (Frankfurt etc.: Peter Lang, 1998)
Schneider, John: The Contemporary Guitar (Oakland, California: University of California Press, 1985; revised edition: Lanham, Maryland: Rowman & Littlefield, 2015)
Schwarz, Werner: Guitar Bibliography. An International Listing of Theoretical Literature on Classical Guitar from the Beginning to the Present / Gitarre-Bibliographie. Internationales Verzeichnis der theoretischen Literatur zur klassischen Gitarre von den Anfängen bis zur Gegenwart (Munich: K.G. Saur, 1984)
Sharpe, A.P.: The Story of the Spanish Guitar (London, Clifford Essex Music Co., 1954; 4th edition, 1968)
Summerfield, Maurice J.: The Classical Guitar. Its Evolution, Players and Personalities since 1800 (Blaydon-on-Tyne: Ashley Mark, 1982; 5th edition, 2002)
Scott Tennant: Pumping Nylon (New York: Alfred Publishing Co., 1995)

T
Tosone, Jim: Classical Guitarists: Conversations (Jefferson, North Carolina: McFarland & Co., 2000)
Turnbull, Harvey: The Guitar (from the Renaissance to the Present Day) (London: B.T. Batsford Ltd. and New York: C. Scribner's Sons, 1974)
Tyler, James: The Guitar and its Music. From the Renaissance to the Classical Era (Oxford: Oxford University Press, 2002)

V
Viglietti, Cédar: Origen e historia de la guitarra (Buenos Aires: Editorial Albatros, 1973)
Villar Rodriguez, José: La guitara española. Caracteristicas y construcción (Barcelona:  Clivis Publicaciones, 1985)

W
Wade, Graham: A Concise History of the Classic Guitar (Pacific, Missouri: Mel Bay, 2001)
Wade, Graham: Traditions of the Classical Guitar (London: Calder, 1980)
Wolff, Eduard & Zelton, Heinrich: Gitarren-Lexikon (Wilhelmshafen: Florian Noetzel Verlag, 1996)

Z
Zuth, Josef: Handbuch der Laute und Gitarre (Vienna: Anton Goll, 1928; reprint, Hildesheim: Georg Olms, 1972; 3rd reprint, 2003)

Classical guitar magazines

External links
Very complete bibliography by Olav Thu, Norway
Bibliography on the San Jose State University’s website annotated by Brian Quinn
A working bibliography compiled from the new grove dictionary of music and musicians, Peter Danner, Hugh Davies, Harvey Turnbull, James Tyler, Tony Bacon, Thomas F. Heck Dennis Davis, Eastern Kentucky University, Department of Music.
Guitar:Music and research guide. McGill's University

Notes

Spanish classical guitar
Guitar